Millburn Community Consolidated School District 24 is a Lake County, Illinois school district that covers parts of Lindenhurst, Old Mill Creek and Wadsworth. , the superintendent is Dr. Jason Lind.

References

External links 

 

School districts in Lake County, Illinois